Mark 56 Gun Fire Control System (Mk.56 GFCS) is a gun fire-control system made up of AN/SPG-35 radar tracker and the Mark 42 ballistic computer.

Overview 
The directional board is maneuverable, equipped with an X-band radar Mk.35 (later renamed AN/SPG-35 based on the naming convention for military electronic equipment) and an optical sight, and is manned with two operators on board. It was an expression. Target tracking by the operator's optical sight is also possible, but fully automated tracking is the basic operation, and blindfire is also possible for the first time as a practical aircraft of the US Navy.

Mark 42 Ballistic Computer 
First, the target is captured by a spiral scan that slowly scans the space by swinging the beam at an angle of 6 degrees, and then a conical scan that quickly measures and distances by narrowing the beam swing angle to 0.5 degrees. Track the target by scanning. The speed of the tracking target is obtained by the gyroscope of the directional board and the tachometer generator of the distance tracking servo system. Ballistic calculation was performed by the Mk.42 ballistic computer housed in the ship, and it was possible to aim two types of guns at the same target by adding a ballistic calculation housing. In addition, during the war, there were many cases where radar tracking could not catch up with the attack aircraft that rushed in at high speed, so Admiral Ernest King, Chief of Naval Operations, equipped with additional optical equipment.

AN/SPG-35 Radar Tracker 
The first model of this model was delivered in August 1945, and has been in operation since the 1950s. Performance improvements continued after the war, and it became possible to start shooting in 2 seconds from the start of tracking for subsonic aircraft. Initially, a 5"/38 cal gun was used as the gun to command, but this became the standard when a rapid-firing twin Mark 33 3"/50 cal gun was developed after the war. Mk.68 GFCS was the standard for the Mark 42 5"/54 cal gun, but this machine was also used as a secondary directional board. Well known electric engineer Ivan A. Getting was involved in the creation of AN/SPG-35.

The Japan Maritime Self-Defense Force requested the equipment of this model with the Harukaze-class destroyer, which was the first domestic escort ship after the war, but it was not approved by the US side, and the actual equipment was in the Second Defense Build-up Plan. There is a history of becoming a Yamagumo-class destroyer or later.

On board ships

United States Navy 
 Midway-class aircraft carrier
 Essex-class aircraft carrier
 
 Des Moines-class cruiser
 Worcester-class cruiser
 Juneau-class cruiser
 Boston-class cruiser
 Baltimore-class cruiser
 Forrest Sherman-class destroyer
 
 Bronstein-class frigate
 Brooke-class frigate
 Garcia-class frigate
 Hamilton-class cutter
 Kilauea-class ammunition ship
 Mars-class combat stores ship
 Sacramento-class fast combat support ship

Maritime Self-Defense Force 

Yamagumo-class destroyer
Minegumo-class destroyer
Takatsuki-class destroyer

MRS-3 
In the United Kingdom, the MRS-3 (Medium Range System) was developed based on this model. The Type 903 radar tracker was commissioned in 1946 and 1958. The Type 904 radar tracker was also developed as a derivative of the GWS.22 Seacat air defense missile system.

In addition, the Mk.64 GUNAR, which changed the shooting command radar to the gun side equipment (initially the same AN/SPG-34 as the Mk.63, later AN/SPG-48), was also developed, and this was mainly used by the Royal Canadian Navy. This later evolved into the Mk.69, which was independently digitized and refurbished by Canada and changed its radar to SPG-515.

Royal Navy 
 
 Tiger-class cruiser
 Daring-class destroyer
 County-class destroyer
 Rothesay-class frigate 
 Leander-class frigate
 Rothesay-class frigate
 Tribal-class frigate

Indian Navy 
 Nilgiri-class frigate

Peruvian Navy 
 Palacios-class destroyer

See also 

 List of radars
 Radar configurations and types
 Fire-control radar

Citations

References 

 Norman Friedman (2006). The Naval Institute Guide to World Naval Weapon Systems.  Naval Institute Press.  ISBN 9781557502629

Naval radars
Military radars of Japan
Military equipment introduced in the 1950s